"Short People" is a song by Randy Newman from his 1977 album, Little Criminals.

The verses and chorus are lyrically constructed as a prejudiced attack on short people. In contrast, the bridge states that "short people are just the same as you and I." Many listeners thought that the song reflected Newman's sincere beliefs. However, Newman intended the song to be a satire about prejudice more broadly: "The guy in that song is crazy. He was not to be believed." As with many of his songs such as "Rednecks", Newman wrote the song from the point of view of a biased narrator.

Production and reception
The song follows a basic musical formula with bass and drums centering on Newman's catchy pop piano line in the key of A major. A small brass section and an electric guitar occasionally rise into the mix and conga drums (played by Los Angeles-based session musician Milt Holland) also feature prominently in the song.

Although Newman had never charted a single before, and his preceding album, Good Old Boys, had been the first to reach the Top 150 on Billboard’s Pop Albums chart, "Short People" soon gained attention as a novelty song. The song consequently became a major hit on radio peaking at No. 2 on the Billboard Hot 100 for three weeks; it was kept from reaching No. 1 by Player's "Baby Come Back" and the Bee Gees' "Stayin' Alive". It became a gold record.

Newman would later grow to dislike the song and its success, eventually calling it a "bad break", a "novelty record like The Chipmunks", and said it caused him to receive several threats regarding its misinterpreted message. He said, "I had no idea that there was any sensitivity, I mean, that anyone could believe that anyone was as crazy as that character. To have that kind of animus against short people, and then to sing it and put it all in song and have a philosophy on it." However, it ended up being included on almost every one of his greatest hits albums.

Record World said the single was "one of the funniest of any year."

In 1978, the State of Maryland delegate Isaiah Dixon attempted to introduce legislation making it illegal to play "Short People" on the radio. He was advised by Attorney General Francis B. Burch that such a law would be a violation of the First Amendment.

Chart performance

Weekly charts

Year-end charts

Personnel

Musicians

 Randy Newman ‒ lead vocals, piano, synthesizer
 Glenn Frey ‒ backing vocals
 J. D. Souther ‒ backing vocals
 Jim Keltner ‒ drums
 Klaus Voormann ‒ bass guitar
 Milt Holland ‒ congas
 Timothy B. Schmit ‒ backing vocals
 Waddy Wachtel ‒ electric guitar
 Mike Boddicker ‒ synthesizer

Technical 
 Lee Herschberg ‒ engineer, masterer, mixer
 Lenny Waronker ‒ producer
 Loyd Clifft ‒ engineer
 Russ Titelman ‒ producer

See also
 List of Cash Box Top 100 number-one singles of 1978

References

External links
 Lyrics of this song
 

1977 songs
1977 singles
Randy Newman songs
Songs written by Randy Newman
Cashbox number-one singles
Novelty songs
Black comedy music
Music controversies
Satirical songs
Dwarfism
Song recordings produced by Lenny Waronker
Warner Records singles
Song recordings produced by Russ Titelman